Hubert Lewis Bray is a mathematician and differential geometer. He is known for having proved the Riemannian Penrose inequality. He works as professor of mathematics and physics at Duke University.

Early life and education 
Hubert is the brother of Clark Bray and grandson of Hubert Evelyn Bray, also American mathematicians.

He earned his B.A. and B.S. degrees in Mathematics and Physics, respectively, in 1992 from Rice University and obtained his Ph.D. in 1997 from Stanford University, under the mentorship of Richard Melvin Schoen.

Career 
He was an invited speaker at the 2002 International Congress of Mathematicians in Beijing (in the section of differential geometry).

He is one of the inaugural fellows of the American Mathematical Society.

Hubert was appointed Professor of Mathematics in 2004, an additionally Professor of Physics in 2019. In 2019, he was appointed Director of Undergraduate Studies of Duke's Mathematics Department.

Personal life 
Hubert is the grandson of Hubert Evelyn Bray, professor of Mathematics at Rice University and the first person awarded a Ph.D. by the then Rice Institute.

Hubert Bray and his brother Clark Bray share similar educations and jobs, both having studied at Rice University (undergraduate), Stanford University (graduate), and are professors of mathematics at Duke University.

See also
Duke University

References

Year of birth missing (living people)
Living people
20th-century American mathematicians
Duke University faculty
Fellows of the American Mathematical Society
Theoretical physicists
Stanford University alumni
Rice University alumni
Mathematical physicists
Geometers
Mathematical analysts
21st-century American mathematicians